Lawrence Otis Graham (December 25, 1961 – February 19, 2021) was an American attorney and New York Times best-selling author.

Early life and education
Graham's grandparents owned a trucking company in Tennessee. His father worked in the field of real estate management in New York. Graham was raised in Mount Vernon, New York, and later in White Plains, New York. He had a brother, Richard, an orthodontist.

He graduated from White Plains High School, then Princeton University with a Bachelor of Arts in English and from Harvard Law School with a Juris Doctor in 1988.

Career
Lawrence Otis Graham was a corporate lawyer at Weil, Gotshal & Manges and a real estate attorney at Cuddy & Feder as well as a New York Times bestselling author of 14 non-fiction books on the subject of politics, education, race, and class in America. His work has appeared in such publications as The New York Times, Reader's Digest (where he served as a contributing editor), Glamour, and U.S. News & World Report.  His book Our Kind of People: Inside America’s Black Upper Class (HarperCollins) was a New York Times, Los Angeles Times and Essence Magazine bestseller, as well as a selection of the Book of the Month Club. A television series based on the book began airing on the Fox network in the fall of 2021.

Graham's book The Senator and The Socialite: the Story of America’s First Black Political Dynasty (HarperCollins) is a biography of U.S. Senator Blanche Bruce, the first black person to serve a full term in the U.S. Senate.  Graham is also the author of such books as The Best Companies for Minorities (Penguin Books) and Proversity: Getting Past Face Value (John Wiley & Sons)—two guides on diversity in the workplace—as well as Member of the Club (HarperCollins) which was originally a cover story on New York Magazine, and was later optioned for a feature film by Warner Brothers. Denzel Washington was scheduled to play Graham but the film was never made.

Graham appeared on numerous TV programs including Charlie Rose, Today Show, The View, Hardball with Chris Matthews, and Good Morning America, and was profiled in USA Today and TIME.

A former adjunct professor at Fordham University, Graham taught African American Studies as well as American Government.

Graham appeared weekly as a political commentator, providing Democratic Party perspectives on News 12 in Westchester.

He was chairman of the Westchester County Police Board and has served on the boards of Red Cross of Westchester, the Boy Scouts of America, Princeton Center for Leadership Training, Jack & Jill Foundation, and Council on Economic Priorities.

Graham was also a trustee of SUNY Purchase College Foundation, University of Pennsylvania School of Veterinary Medicine, the Eaglebrook School; the American Theatre Wing, co-presenters of the Tony Awards and the Horace Mann School in New York City.

2000 Congressional campaign
During the 2000 United States House of Representatives elections, Graham challenged incumbent Republican Sue W. Kelly for her seat in New York's 19th congressional district. He was unsuccessful.

Personal life
Graham was married to corporate executive Pamela Thomas-Graham. They lived in Manhattan and in Chappaqua, New York, and had three children.

He was Catholic.

Death 
Graham died in Chappaqua on February 19, 2021. He was buried at Ferncliff Cemetery in Westchester.

Books
Graham's books centralize on African-American social class.
 The Senator and the Socialite: The True Story of America's First Black Dynasty (2006) – This is the true story of America's first black dynasty and follows three generations of a family that rose from slavery to the U.S. Senate.  Born a Mississippi slave in 1841, Blanche Kelso Bruce amassed a real estate fortune and became the first black person to serve a full Senate term. He married Josephine Willson, the daughter of a wealthy black doctor, and they broke racial barriers as a socialite couple in 1880s Washington, D.C.  By hosting white Republicans like President Ulysses S. Grant and notable black people such as Frederick Douglass, Bruce gained appointments under four Presidents, culminating with a US Treasury post which placed his name on all U.S. currency.
 Our Kind of People: Inside America's Black Upper Class (1999) – Debutante cotillions. Million-dollar homes. Summers in Martha's Vineyard and Sag Harbor. Membership in The Links, Jack and Jill, Deltas, Boulés, and AKAs. An obsession with the right schools, families, churches, social clubs, and skin complexion. This is the world of the black upper class and the focus of the first book written about the black elite by a member of this hard-to-penetrate group. A television series based on the book began airing on the Fox network in the fall of 2021.
 Proversity: Getting Past Face Value (1997)
 Member of The Club: Reflections on Life in a Polarized World (1995) – Member of the Club was Graham's eleventh book, but it was the one that brought national recognition to his essays on race, class and politics. It's known for revealing Graham's experience of leaving his successful corporate law practice at one of New York's largest law firms in order to go undercover as a busboy at a famous Connecticut country club that discriminates against African Americans, Asians, Hispanics, Jews, and women. An excerpt of this book appeared in a cover story for ''New York Magazine.'

References

External links
 
 Official Site of Lawrence Otis Graham

Harvard Law School alumni
1961 births
2021 deaths
Princeton University alumni
African-American historians
21st-century American historians
People from Chappaqua, New York
People from Westchester County, New York
People from White Plains, New York
People from the Upper East Side
Historians from New York (state)
New York (state) lawyers
White Plains High School alumni
African-American lawyers
20th-century American lawyers
20th-century American historians
20th-century American male writers
21st-century American lawyers
21st-century American male writers
American male non-fiction writers
Burials at Ferncliff Cemetery
20th-century African-American writers
21st-century African-American writers
African-American Catholics
African-American male writers